Hiromasa (written: 博正, 宏昌, 弘昌, 弘将, 浩正, 大将 or 太将) is a masculine Japanese given name. Notable people with the name include:

, Japanese footballer
, Japanese swimmer
, Japanese composer and music producer
, Japanese footballer
, Japanese noble and musician
, Japanese footballer
, Japanese decathlete
, Japanese footballer
, Japanese footballer
, Japanese animator and director
, Japanese businessman

Japanese masculine given names